McCrary may refer to:

McCrary, Mississippi, a village in the United States
Runyon v. McCrary, a Supreme Court of the United States case
McCrary (surname), people with the surname McCrary